Kalistratikha is a rural locality (a selo) and the administrative center of Kalistratikhinsky Selsoviet of Kalmansky District, Altai Krai, Russia. The population was 883 as of 2016. There are 16 streets.

Geography 
Kalistratikha is located on the right bank of the Eraska River, 13 km north of Kalmanka (the district's administrative centre) by road. Buranovo is the nearest rural locality.

Ethnicity 
The village is inhabited by Russians and others.

References 

Rural localities in Slavgorod urban okrug